Eidonomy is the study of the external appearance of an organism. It is thus the opposite of anatomy, which refers to internal morphology.  While predominant early in the history of biology, eidonomy is little studied in particular anymore as it is rife with the effects of convergent evolution, or evolution of similar features from distant organism varieties.  It thus yields less new information about organisms than anatomy, and therefore the external appearance of lifeforms is usually studied as part of general investigations in morphology, e.g. in the context of phylogenetic research.

See also
Phenotype
Phenotypic trait

References 
 Eidonomy in the Museum of Learning, by Discovery Media

Branches of biology